Moshe ben Mordechai Galante (died 1608 in Safed), was a 16th-century rabbi. He was a disciple of Joseph Caro, and was ordained by Caro when he was only twenty-two years old. He wrote sermons for a wedding, for Passover, and for a thanksgiving service, printed with the younger Obadiah Bertinoro's commentary on the Book of Esther (Venice, 1585). He also wrote Miftaḥ ha-Zohar, an index of Biblical passages found in the Zohar and additions from old manuscripts (ib. 1566), Kehillat Ya'aḳob, a cabalistic commentary on Ecclesiastes (ib. 1577–78), and responsa with additions by his son Jedidiah Galante (ib. 1608).

See also
 Galante (pedigree)

References
 

16th-century births
1608 deaths
Rabbis in Safed
Kabbalists
Rabbis in Ottoman Galilee
16th-century rabbis from the Ottoman Empire
Sephardi rabbis in Ottoman Palestine